The Billboard Hot 100 is a chart that ranks the best-performing singles of the United States. Its data, published by Billboard magazine and compiled by Nielsen SoundScan, is based collectively on each single's weekly physical and digital sales, as well as airplay and streaming. Throughout a year, Billboard will publish an annual list of the 100 most successful songs throughout that year on the Hot 100 chart based on the information. For 2014, the list was published on December 9, calculated with data from December 7, 2013 to November 29, 2014.

Katy Perry was the top Hot 100 artist of 2014, with "Dark Horse", ranked as the number-two song of the year and featuring Juicy J, the highest of her three placements on the list.

This was the first time in eight years that a male artist topped the chart with a non-collaboration.

List

See also
2014 in American music
List of Billboard Hot 100 number-one singles of 2014
List of Billboard Hot 100 top-ten singles in 2014

References

2014 record charts
Billboard charts